Svee is a surname. Notable people with the surname include: 

Gary Svee (born 1943), American author and journalist
Stig Tore Svee (born 1963), Norwegian ice sledge hockey player

See also
Sven